Rumana Ali is a Bangladeshi academic, writer and politician from Gazipur belonging to Bangladesh Awami League. She is the incumbent  Jatiya Sangsad member for Reserved Women's Seat-14. She is ex state  minister Md. Rahmat Ali's daughter. Her eldest brother M. Zahid Hasan is a well known physicist at Princeton University.

Biography
Ali is a teacher of New Model University College, Dhaka. She also wrote a book titled Prachin Kirti O Oitihasik Sthan.

Ali was elected as a member of the Jatiya Sangsad from Reserved Women's Seat-14 on 16 February 2019.

References

Awami League politicians
People from Gazipur District
Bangladeshi women writers
Bangladeshi women academics
11th Jatiya Sangsad members
Women members of the Jatiya Sangsad
Living people
21st-century Bangladeshi women politicians
1976 births